Kekuli Bay Provincial Park, formerly Kalamalka West Provincial Park, is a provincial park in British Columbia, Canada, located on the west shore of Kalamalka Lake on BC Highway 97 south of Vernon. The lake is popular for waterskiing and boating, and the park includes a boat launch, as well as a campground with a view of the lake. The park was established in 1990.

See also
Quiggly hole ("kekuli")
List of Chinook Jargon placenames

References

Provincial parks of British Columbia
Chinook Jargon place names
Provincial parks in the Okanagan
Year of establishment missing